The 1907-08 French Rugby Union Championship was won by Stade Français that beat SBUC in the final.

This was the 4th time the final was between these teams, but finally Stade Français ended the series of successes by SBUC.

Semifinals

Final 

 Stade Français Charles Beaurin, B.Moussou, S.Archer, W.Hadley, Jules Icart, René Duval, Marcel Communeau, Paul Maclos, Bernard Galichon, Gilbert Charpentier, Émile Lesieur, Francis Mouronval, Jacques Dedet, Charles Vareilles, Julien

SBUC Herman Droz, Robert Blanchard, Augustin Hordebaigt, Alphonse Massé, Louis Mulot, Albert Branlat, Marc Giacardy, Marcel Laffitte, Jack Hird, André Lacassagne, Maurice Bruneau, Maurice Leuvielle, Louis Versfeld, Hélier Thil, Henri Martin

External links
 Compte rendu de la finale de 1908, sur lnr.fr

Notes and references 

1908
Championship
France